William John Trevor "Jack" Evans (April 21, 1928 – November 10, 1996) was a Canadian professional ice hockey defenceman and coach who played 14 seasons in the National Hockey League for the New York Rangers and Chicago Black Hawks.

Early life
Evans was born in Morriston, Wales, but emigrated with his parents to Drumheller, Alberta, in his youth. He spoke only the Welsh Language and no English until he entered school, and later spoke the language with an elongated drawl; the similarities between Evans' manner of speaking and the traditional American Southern accent led to him earning the nickname of "Tex" from teammates. Although he did not begin playing hockey until age 14, by age 20, Evans was a leading junior league defenceman and participated in the 1948 Memorial Cup. That same year, he signed a minor league contract with the Rangers.

Career
Evans played five games over the next two seasons, while gaining experience in the American Hockey League. He would then spend the next four years as the Rangers' seventh defenceman, moving in and out of the lineup as needed and serving as a valuable defensive reserve. During the 1954–55 NHL season, Evans finally cracked the regular lineup and worked significant minutes for the next three years on the blue line. In 1958, he was claimed by Chicago, where he would play in a similar role for his final four seasons. He was a member of the 1961 Stanley Cup winning team making him the first Welsh born Stanley Cup Champion. Jack Evans played in 1962 NHL All Star game in Toronto also making him the first NHL All Star player originating from Wales. In 1964, the Black Hawks released Evans, but the veteran continued to play in a variety of minor leagues until he finally retired in 1972 at the age of 44.

In 1974, Evans was hired to coach the Salt Lake Golden Eagles of the WHL. After one season that included coach of the year honors, he was promoted to the parent club California Golden Seals. He coached the anemic franchise in its final year in the San Francisco Bay Area and its two seasons as the Cleveland Barons before the financially-troubled organization merged with the Minnesota North Stars in 1978.

Evans returned to the ECHL bench before being hired by the Hartford Whalers in 1983. In his third season with the club, he earned a playoff berth, and in 1987, he led the club to a division title. A poor performance the following year resulted in Evans being fired midseason.

Personal life
Evans died of prostate cancer at his Manchester, Connecticut, home in 1996 at the age of 68.

NHL Coaching record

See also
List of National Hockey League players from the United Kingdom

References

External links

1928 births
1996 deaths
Buffalo Bisons (AHL) players
California Golden Seals coaches
Canadian expatriate ice hockey players in the United States
Canadian ice hockey coaches
Canadian ice hockey defencemen
Chicago Blackhawks players
Cincinnati Mohawks (AHL) players
Cleveland Barons (NHL) coaches
Deaths from cancer in Connecticut
Deaths from prostate cancer
Hartford Whalers coaches
Hartford Whalers scouts
Ice hockey people from Alberta
Los Angeles Blades (WHL) players
Naturalized citizens of Canada
New Haven Ramblers players
New York Rangers players
People from Drumheller
St. Louis Blues scouts
San Diego Gulls (WHL) players
San Francisco Seals (ice hockey) players
Saskatoon Quakers players
Stanley Cup champions
Vancouver Canucks (WHL) players
Victoria Cougars (1949–1961) players
Welsh emigrants to Canada